The Tepalcatepec Valley garter snake (Thamnophis postremus) is a species of snake of the family Colubridae. It is found in Mexico.

References 

Reptiles described in 1942
Taxa named by Hobart Muir Smith
Reptiles of Mexico
postremus